The 2003 World Taekwondo Championships are the 16th edition of the World Taekwondo Championships, and were held in Garmisch-Partenkirchen, Germany from September 24 to September 28, 2003. A total of 830 athletes, 502 males and 328 females, from 100 nations took part in the championships.

Medal summary

Men

Women

Medal table

Team ranking

Men

Women

References

WTF Medal Winners

External links
Official Website

World Championships
World Taekwondo Championships
World Taekwondo Championships
Taekwondo Championships
Taekwondo competitions in Germany